West Rajabazar is a mahallah (neighborhood) in Ward 27 of Sher-e-Bangla Thana, Dhaka city, Bangladesh. According to the 2011 Bangladesh census, it had 4,493 households and a population of 22,397.

References

Neighbourhoods in Dhaka